Indonesians in the Philippines consist of expatriates and immigrants from Indonesia residing in the Philippines, and their descendants. Among them were many formerly stateless people, legally called Persons of Indonesian descent (PID), whom the United Nations and the governments of the two countries helped to acquire citizenship.

According to the 2000 Philippines census, there were 43,871 Indonesians in the Philippines, making them the 5th-largest group of foreigners in the Philippines. Most reside in Mindanao, especially in Davao del Sur, Davao del Norte, Davao Oriental, Sarangani, Sultan Kudarat, North Cotabato, South Cotabato, General Santos and Davao City, although there is also a sizable Indonesian population in Metro Manila.

As the two countries are neighbors, there have been many historical migrations between the islands that today make up their national territories, and migrants from what is today Indonesia helped form many historical dynasties in the Philippines.

Migration and settlement

Ancient and Islamic eras

Migrations between the territories that today make up Indonesia and the Philippines were extremely common during the ancient-era. The people of Indonesia are descendants of a common migration from the Philippines and Taiwan. Certain tribes, mostly from Sumatra and Borneo back-migrated to the Philippines, particularly to the central and southern parts. According to Visayan legend, Sri Lumay, a Malay-Tamil prince from Sumatra was one of the earliest major settlers to Visayas. He found the Rajahnate of Cebu, and his descendants played a key role in the Spanish conquest of the Philippines.

The Sulu Archipelago was under the jurisprudence and sphere of influence of the Javanese Majapahit Empire. The Laguna Copperplate Inscription, the Philippines' oldest document found, also records interactions between the Classical Tagalog kingdoms in Luzon to that of those in modern-day Indonesia. The people of the two countries also spoke the Malay language as a lingua franca.

During the age of Islamic sultanates and states, preachers from Sumatra helped spread Islam. Rajah Baguinda, a Minangkabau prince from Sumatra, spread Islam to the people of the Sulu Archipelago. He became a founding father for the Sultanate of Sulu. Islam in Mindanao was also introduced by the Ternateans.

During the Spanish colonial era, most if any migrants or descendants of migrants from modern-day Indonesia were assimilated either into the Hispanized Catholic population or the Moro Muslim population. For a while, the Spanish had tried to colonize eastern Indonesia, particularly the Maluku Islands, sharing it with the Portuguese. In 1606, the Spanish conquered the Ternate Sultanate, deporting the Sultan and his family to Manila. The Spanish colonists shared it with the Dutch, and abandoned it in 1663.

Modern-day
From 1925 to 1926, famous Indonesian national hero and ex-PKI member Tan Malaka lived in Manila. There he became a correspondent of the nationalist newspaper El Debate, edited by Francisco Varona. Publication of Malaka's works, such as a second edition of Naar de Republiek Indonesia (December 1925) and Semangat Moeda (Young Spirit; 1926) might have been supported by Varona. There Malaka also met Mariano de los Santos, José Abad Santos, and Crisanto Evangelista.

Some Indonesians, mostly from Sangirs background, came to Mindanao as early as the 1970s, settling down and married local women. However, the largest influx, consisting of fishermen and petty traders, began settling illegally in the early 1980s. They continue to maintain consciousness of their separate ethnic identity, as well as material links with Indonesia. Illegal entry and settlement is easy due to the Philippines' long coastline and insufficient personnel in the Border Crossing Office. More recently, many of the fishermen in fact have landing permits which allow them to move freely around the area where their boats are docked.

Registration, residency, and repatriation
As early as 1990, the Philippine government had been attempting to get Indonesians to register with the authorities, holding out the possibility that they might be granted citizenship as an incentive. However, a survey the next year, which counted 7,200 Indonesians living illegally in the area, found that few wanted to be naturalized in the Philippines, though they hoped to obtain permanent residency in order to regularize their living situation, while 30-35% hoped to be repatriated to Indonesia. That survey found the largest community of Indonesians in Sarangani province, with others in South Cotabato, Sultan Kudarat, Davao City, Davao del Norte, Davao Oriental, and North Cotabato. At that time, they planned to deport 1,738 of them. In 2002, the Philippine government, alarmed by the number of Indonesian nationals implicated in recent Jemaah Islamiyah bombings in the Philippines, drew up a plan to deport a further 12,000 Indonesians from Mindanao; however, the implementation of the plan stalled due to disagreements between the Philippine and Indonesian governments over who would pay for it. Indonesians in the Philippines are often stereotyped as terrorists as a result.

The militants responsible for the 2005 beheadings of Christians were also trained in the southern Philippines.

In 2003 and again in 2005, the Philippine government initiated another survey and registration drive; that one registered 2,448 Philippine-born Indonesians, including 247 in General Santos, 371 in Glan-Sarangani, 265 in Davao del Sur, 108 in Davao City, 339 in Kiamba, Tupi and Malapatan, another 253 in Sarangani Island, 341 in Isulan, Sultan Kudarat and Kidapawan, and an additional 154 in Sarangani and Davao del Sur. The Indonesian government is also attempting to convince them to register with the local Indonesian consulate and with the Philippine government, and offered to pay their registration fees for identity documents.

In 2015, UNHCR recorded at least 8,756 registered Indonesians in Mindanao are at risk of statelessness. A year later, 664 stateless people of Indonesian descent in Mindanao were granted Philippine or Indonesian citizenship. It was part of a joint program between the Philippine government and Indonesian consulate in the Philippines to end statelessness for people of Indonesian descent living in the country. They were given a choice of either Indonesian or Filipino citizenship. Of the 664, 536 people were confirmed to have become Filipino citizens, and 128 chose to become Indonesian citizens. As of February 2016, there are 8,745 registered PIDs in Southern Philippines, consist of 3,155 in Sarangani, 2,777 in Davao Del Sur, 859 in General Santos, 688 in South Cotabato, 679 in Davao Oriental, 279 in Davao City, 176 in Sultan Kudarat, and 133 in North Cotabato.

Education
According to the study conducted by the UNHCR in 2012, more than 6,000 persons of Indonesian descent in southern Philippines are having problematic access to education, due to their unclear citizenship status and poverty they experienced.

Meanwhile, the Philippines is becoming an increasingly popular destination for Indonesian international students, both those in short term courses, and those studying for university degrees. English as a foreign language courses are one well-known draw for students from all over Asia, but other subject areas are gaining in popularity as well. In particular, flight training courses are much cheaper in the Philippines than in Indonesia. The Asian Institute of Management also attracts many Indonesian students. There is also an Indonesian school (with dormitory for boarding students) and Indonesian Cultural Center called "House of Indonesia" in Davao City.

There are also many Indonesians in Metro Manila, mostly Chinese-Indonesian, who are either university students or medical residents (mostly Dermatology and Pediatrics).

See also
Filipinos in Indonesia
Malays in the Philippines
Indonesia–Philippines relations

References

Further reading

Philippines
Asian diaspora in the Philippines
 
Indonesia–Philippines relations
Muslim communities of the Philippines